Alessandro Ciriani (born 2 August 1970, in Pordenone) is an Italian politician.

He served as President of the Province of Pordenone from 2009 to 2014.

Ciriani ran as an independent for the office of Mayor of Pordenone at the 2016 Italian local elections, supported by a centre-right coalition. He won and took office on 20 June 2016.

See also
2016 Italian local elections
List of mayors of Pordenone

References

External links
 
 

1970 births
Living people
Mayors of Pordenone
People from Pordenone
Presidents of the Province of Pordenone